Tanat Valley Coaches operates bus and coach services in Montgomeryshire and Shropshire, in the United Kingdom. 

The family-run firm is based in Llanrhaeadr-ym-Mochnant. It also has a depot in the nearby village of Pentrefelin, in addition to Kerry, near Newtown, Powys. The former includes facilities to park vehicles, whilst the latter includes workshop premises and is used to operate services. 

In addition to bus and coach operation, Tanat provides private and commercial vehicle service and repair facilities within two large and fully equipped workshops.

It has a wide variety of vehicles of minibuses, midibuses, single-decker buses, double-decker buses and coaches. Tanat Valley operate 22 local public bus services, many of which are contracted by Powys County Council and Shropshire Council. The local councils and schools also contract 34 school buses, which carry approximately 1,560 students every school day. The fleet amounts to approximately 60 vehicles.

See also
List of bus operators of the United Kingdom

References

External links

Company website

Bus operators in Wales
Bus operators in Shropshire
Companies based in Powys